Heliactis venusta is an unaccepted scientific name and may refer to two species of sea anemone:
 Sagartia elegans, found in coastal areas of north-western Europe 
 Sagartia troglodytes, the mud sagartia, found in the north-eastern Atlantic Ocean, the North Sea and the Mediterranean Sea.